The 8th constituency of Alpes-Maritimes is a French legislative constituency currently represented by Alexandra Martin of The Republicans (LR).  It contains the town and surrounding areas of Cannes.

Historic Representation

Election results

2022

2017

2012

|- style="background-color:#E9E9E9;text-align:center;"
! colspan="2" rowspan="2" style="text-align:left;" | Candidate
! rowspan="2" colspan="2" style="text-align:left;" | Party
! colspan="2" | 1st round
! colspan="2" | 2nd round
|- style="background-color:#E9E9E9;text-align:center;"
! width="75" | Votes
! width="30" | %
! width="75" | Votes
! width="30" | %
|-
| style="background-color:" |
| style="text-align:left;" | Bernard Brochand
| style="text-align:left;" | Union for a Popular Movement
| UMP
| 
| 47.78%
| 
| 66.13%
|-
| style="background-color:" |
| style="text-align:left;" | Adrien Grosjean
| style="text-align:left;" | National Front
| FN
| 
| 23.71%
| 
| 33.87%
|-
| style="background-color:" |
| style="text-align:left;" | Elisabeth Deborde
| style="text-align:left;" | The Greens
| VEC
| 
| 21.13%
| colspan="2" style="text-align:left;" |
|-
| style="background-color:" |
| style="text-align:left;" | Sylvie Rolly
| style="text-align:left;" | Left Front
| FG
| 
| 3.16%
| colspan="2" style="text-align:left;" |
|-
| style="background-color:" |
| style="text-align:left;" | Serge Gardien
| style="text-align:left;" | Ecologist
| ECO
| 
| 1.67%
| colspan="2" style="text-align:left;" |
|-
| style="background-color:" |
| style="text-align:left;" | Marlène Poirier
| style="text-align:left;" | Miscellaneous Right
| DVD
| 
| 1.30%
| colspan="2" style="text-align:left;" |
|-
| style="background-color:" |
| style="text-align:left;" | Jean-Pierre Villon
| style="text-align:left;" | Ecologist
| ECO
| 
| 0.90%
| colspan="2" style="text-align:left;" |
|-
| style="background-color:" |
| style="text-align:left;" | Liliane Pecout
| style="text-align:left;" | Far Left
| EXG
| 
| 0.36%
| colspan="2" style="text-align:left;" |
|-
| colspan="8" style="background-color:#E9E9E9;"|
|- style="font-weight:bold"
| colspan="4" style="text-align:left;" | Total
| 
| 100%
| 
| 100%
|-
| colspan="8" style="background-color:#E9E9E9;"|
|-
| colspan="4" style="text-align:left;" | Registered voters
| 
| style="background-color:#E9E9E9;"|
| 
| style="background-color:#E9E9E9;"|
|-
| colspan="4" style="text-align:left;" | Blank/Void ballots
| 
| 1.66%
| 
| 8.24%
|-
| colspan="4" style="text-align:left;" | Turnout
| 
| 53.74%
| 
| 46.94%
|-
| colspan="4" style="text-align:left;" | Abstentions
| 
| 46.26%
| 
| 53.06%
|-
| colspan="8" style="background-color:#E9E9E9;"|
|- style="font-weight:bold"
| colspan="6" style="text-align:left;" | Result
| colspan="2" style="background-color:" | UMP HOLD
|}

2007

|- style="background-color:#E9E9E9;text-align:center;"
! colspan="2" rowspan="2" style="text-align:left;" | Candidate
! rowspan="2" colspan="2" style="text-align:left;" | Party
! colspan="2" | 1st round
! colspan="2" | 2nd round
|- style="background-color:#E9E9E9;text-align:center;"
! width="75" | Votes
! width="30" | %
! width="75" | Votes
! width="30" | %
|-
| style="background-color:" |
| style="text-align:left;" | Bernard Brochand
| style="text-align:left;" | Union for a Popular Movement
| UMP
| 
| 42.60%
| 
| 54.97%
|-
| style="background-color:" |
| style="text-align:left;" | Henri Leroy
| style="text-align:left;" | Miscellaneous Right
| DVD
| 
| 27.90%
| 
| 45.03%
|-
| style="background-color:" |
| style="text-align:left;" | Apolline Crapiz
| style="text-align:left;" | Socialist Party
| PS
| 
| 11.91%
| colspan="2" style="text-align:left;" |
|-
| style="background-color:" |
| style="text-align:left;" | Lydia Schenardi
| style="text-align:left;" | National Front
| FN
| 
| 6.27%
| colspan="2" style="text-align:left;" |
|-
| style="background-color:" |
| style="text-align:left;" | Patrick Lafargue
| style="text-align:left;" | Democratic Movement
| MoDem
| 
| 5.70%
| colspan="2" style="text-align:left;" |
|-
| style="background-color:" |
| style="text-align:left;" | Sylvie Rolly
| style="text-align:left;" | Communist
| COM
| 
| 1.54%
| colspan="2" style="text-align:left;" |
|-
| style="background-color:" |
| style="text-align:left;" | Lionel Nussle
| style="text-align:left;" | The Greens
| VEC
| 
| 1.40%
| colspan="2" style="text-align:left;" |
|-
| style="background-color:" |
| style="text-align:left;" | Jean-Pierre Villon
| style="text-align:left;" | Ecologist
| ECO
| 
| 1.16%
| colspan="2" style="text-align:left;" |
|-
| style="background-color:" |
| style="text-align:left;" | Henri Vincent-Viry
| style="text-align:left;" | Far Right
| EXD
| 
| 0.50%
| colspan="2" style="text-align:left;" |
|-
| style="background-color:" |
| style="text-align:left;" | Henri Cyvoct
| style="text-align:left;" | Far Left
| EXG
| 
| 0.46%
| colspan="2" style="text-align:left;" |
|-
| style="background-color:" |
| style="text-align:left;" | Ginette Barbarin
| style="text-align:left;" | Divers
| DIV
| 
| 0.31%
| colspan="2" style="text-align:left;" |
|-
| style="background-color:" |
| style="text-align:left;" | Michel Brun
| style="text-align:left;" | Divers
| DIV
| 
| 0.23%
| colspan="2" style="text-align:left;" |
|-
| colspan="8" style="background-color:#E9E9E9;"|
|- style="font-weight:bold"
| colspan="4" style="text-align:left;" | Total
| 
| 100%
| 
| 100%
|-
| colspan="8" style="background-color:#E9E9E9;"|
|-
| colspan="4" style="text-align:left;" | Registered voters
| 
| style="background-color:#E9E9E9;"|
| 
| style="background-color:#E9E9E9;"|
|-
| colspan="4" style="text-align:left;" | Blank/Void ballots
| 
| 1.29%
| 
| 7.48%
|-
| colspan="4" style="text-align:left;" | Turnout
| 
| 60.01%
| 
| 53.15%
|-
| colspan="4" style="text-align:left;" | Abstentions
| 
| 39.99%
| 
| 46.85%
|-
| colspan="8" style="background-color:#E9E9E9;"|
|- style="font-weight:bold"
| colspan="6" style="text-align:left;" | Result
| colspan="2" style="background-color:" | UMP HOLD
|}

2002

 
 
 
 
 
 
|-
| colspan="8" bgcolor="#E9E9E9"|
|-

1997

 
 
 
 
 
 
 
 
|-
| colspan="8" bgcolor="#E9E9E9"|
|-

References and sources
Results at the Ministry of the Interior (French)

8